Bolshaya Khvoshchevatka is a rural locality (a khutor) in Sagunovskoye Rural Settlement, Podgorensky District, Voronezh Oblast, Russia. The population was 316 as of 2010. There are 3 streets.

Geography 
Bolshaya Khvoshchevatka is located 30 km north of Podgorensky (the district's administrative centre) by road. Yudino is the nearest rural locality.

References 

Rural localities in Podgorensky District